Chartier may refer to :

Canada
 Clément Chartier (b. 1946), a Métis leader
 Eugène Chartier (1893–1963), a violinist, violist, conductor and teacher
 Paul Joseph Chartier (1921–1966), died when a bomb he was preparing exploded in a washroom of the Parliament of Canada
 Richard J. F. Chartier, a judge of the Manitoba Court of Appeal 
 Antoine Chartier de Lotbinière Harwood (1825–1891), a Quebec lawyer and political figure
 Michel-Eustache-Gaspard-Alain Chartier de Lotbinière (1748–1822), a seigneur and political figure
 Chartier v. Chartier,  a leading case decided by the Supreme Court of Canada on the legal role of step parents in a marriage (1999)

France
 Alain Chartier (c. 1392 – c. 1430), a poet and political writer
 Saint-Chartier, a town and commune in the Indre département
 Émile-Auguste Chartier, commonly known as Alain (1868–1951), a philosopher, journalist and pacifist
Roger Chartier (1945 – ), a French historian and historiographer
Chez Chartier, a restaurant in Paris since 1896

United States
 Gary Chartier (born 1966), a legal theorist and philosopher.
 Martin Chartier (1655 – 1718), French-Canadian frontiersman and fur trader
 Peter Chartier (1690 - abt 1759), his son, a French fur trader and early settler in Western Pennsylvania
 Richard Chartier (born 1971), a sound/installation artist and graphic designer
 Tim Chartier (born 1969), mathematician

See also

 Chartiers (disambiguation)